Arthur March (23 February 1891  – 17 April 1957) was an Austrian physicist.

From 1909 he studied mathematics and physics at the Universities of Innsbruck, Munich and Vienna, earning his doctorate in 1913. In 1917 he obtained his habilitation, and in 1928 became an associate professor at Innsbruck. From 1934 to 1936 he was a visiting professor at the University of Oxford, afterwards returning to Innsbruck as a full professor of theoretical physics.

March is known for his research in the field of quantum mechanics. One of his more intriguing projects involved finding the smallest space-time distance.

Written works 
 Theorie der Strahlung und der Quanten, 1919 - Theory of radiation and quantum.
 Die Grundlagen der Quantenmechanik, 1931 - The foundation of quantum mechanics.
 Einführung in die moderne Atomphysik, 1933 - Introduction to modern atomic physics.
 Der Weg des Universums, Bern 1948.
 Natur und Erkenntnis in der Konstruktion des heutigen Physikers, 1948.
 "Quantum mechanics of particles and wave fields", 1951.
 "The new world of physics", 1962 (with Ira M. Freeman); based on Das neue Denken der modernen Physik, 1957, (second edition- 1967).

References 
 working link

Further reading

External links 
 

Austrian physicists
Academic staff of the University of Innsbruck
1891 births
1957 deaths
People from Brixen